Eucalyptus roycei, commonly known as Shark Bay mallee, is a species of mallee or a small tree that is endemic to a small area along the Gascoyne coast of Western Australia. It has rough fibrous or flaky bark on the lower trunk, smooth greyish bark above, lance-shaped to curved adult leaves, flower buds in groups of seven or nine, cream-coloured or pale yellow flowers and cylindrical to barrel-shaped, four-sided fruit.

Description
It has rough fibrous or flaky greyish bark at the base, smooth greyish to cream-coloured bark above. Flowering occurs between January and March and the flowers are white, cream-coloured or pale yellow.

Taxonomy
Eucalyptus roycei was first formally described in 1970 by Maisie Carr, Denis Carr and Alex George in Proceedings of the Royal Society of Victoria. The type specimen was collected near Hamelin Pool in 1966 by Eleanor Marion Scrymgeour and Maisie Carr. The specific epithet (roycei) honours Robert Dunlop Royce who was a member of the staff of the Western Australian Herbarium.

Distribution
Shark Bay mallee is found on sand plains in the Gascoyne region centred around Shark Bay where it grows in red calcareous sandy soils. The mallee is part of the tree heath community found in Shark Bay at the overlap of the South West botanical province and the Eremaean botanical province. Associated species include Eucalyptus beardiana, Grevillea rogersoniana, Acacia drepanophylla, Banksia ashbyi and Grevillea rogersoniana.

Use in horticulture
The plant is fast-growing and is wind-, drought- and frost-tolerant. It is usually grown in a full-sun position in well-drained soils. Although it is not regarded as a very attractive tree, it is available commercially for bush or park settings.

See also
List of Eucalyptus species

References

Eucalypts of Western Australia
Trees of Australia
roycei
Myrtales of Australia
Plants described in 1970
Taxa named by Alex George
Taxa named by Maisie Carr